There have been seven baronetcies created for persons with the surname Wood, one in the Baronetage of England, one in the Baronetage of Nova Scotia, one in the Baronetage of Great Britain and four in the Baronetage of the United Kingdom.

The Wood baronetcy was created in the Baronetage of England in c. 1657 for Henry Wood, member of parliament for Hythe from 1661 to 1671. The title became extinct on his death in 1671.

The Wood baronetcy, of Bonnytown in the County of Forfar, was created in the Baronetage of Nova Scotia on 11 May 1666 for John Wood. The title became extinct on the death of the second Baronet in 1738.

The Wood baronetcy, of Barnsley, was created in the Baronetage of Great Britain on 22 January 1784. For more information on this creation, see the Earl of Halifax (1944 creation).

The Wood baronetcy, of Gatton in the County of Surrey, was created in the Baronetage of the United Kingdom on 3 October 1808 for Mark Wood. The second Baronet represented Gatton in the House of Commons. The title became extinct on his death in 1837.

The Wood baronetcy, of Hatherley House in the County of Gloucester, was created in the Baronetage of the United Kingdom on 16 December 1837. For more information on this creation, see Page Wood baronets.

The Wood baronetcy, of The Hermitage in Chester-le-Street in the County of Durham, was created in the Baronetage of the United Kingdom on 23 September 1897 for Lindsay Wood. The title became extinct on the death of the third Baronet in 1946.

The Wood baronetcy, of Hengrave in the County of Suffolk, was created in the Baronetage of the United Kingdom on 14 February 1918 for John Wood, Conservative Member of Parliament for Stalybridge and Stalybridge and Hyde. The title became extinct on the death of the second Baronet in 1974. Sir Samuel Hill-Wood, 1st Baronet, of Morfield, was the first cousin of the first Baronet (see Hill-Wood baronets).

Wood baronets (c. 1657)
Sir Henry Wood, 1st Baronet (1597–1671)

Wood baronets, of Bonnytown (1666)
Sir John Wood, 1st Baronet (–1693)
Sir James Wood, 2nd Baronet (died 1738)

Wood baronets, of Barnsley (1784)
see the Earl of Halifax (1944 creation)

Wood baronets, of Gatton (1808)
Sir Mark Wood, 1st Baronet (1750–1829)
Sir Mark Wood, 2nd Baronet (1794–1837)

Wood, later Page Wood baronets, of Hatherley House (1837)
see Page Wood baronets

Wood baronets, of The Hermitage (1897)
Sir Lindsay Wood, 1st Baronet (1834–1920)
Sir Arthur Nicholas Lindsay Wood, 2nd Baronet (1875–1939)
Sir Ian Lindsay Wood, 3rd Baronet (1909–1946)

Wood baronets, of Hengrave (1918)
Sir John Wood, 1st Baronet (1857–1951)
Sir John Arthur Haigh Wood, 2nd Baronet (1888–1974)

See also
Hill-Wood baronets

References

Kidd, Charles, Williamson, David (editors). Debrett's Peerage and Baronetage (1990 edition). New York: St Martin's Press, 1990.

Baronetcies in the Baronetage of Great Britain
Extinct baronetcies in the Baronetage of England
Extinct baronetcies in the Baronetage of Nova Scotia
Extinct baronetcies in the Baronetage of the United Kingdom
1657 establishments in England
1666 establishments in Nova Scotia
1784 establishments in Great Britain
1808 establishments in the United Kingdom